Parker Township is one of fifteen townships in Clark County, Illinois, US.  As of the 2010 census, its population was 186 and it contained 124 housing units.

Geography

Unincorporated towns
 Cleone
 Oilfield
(This list is based on USGS data and may include former settlements.)

Major highways
  Interstate 70
  Illinois Route 49

Demographics

School districts
 Casey-Westfield Community Unit School District 4c
 Martinsville Community Unit School District 3c

Political districts
 Illinois' 15th congressional district
 State House District 109
 State Senate District 55

References
 
 United States Census Bureau 2007 TIGER/Line Shapefiles
 United States National Atlas

External links
 City-Data.com
 Illinois State Archives

Townships in Clark County, Illinois
Townships in Illinois